Anja Crevar (Serbian Cyrillic: Ања Цревар; born 24 May 2000) is a Serbian swimmer, and a member of the UCAM Club Natación Fuensanta.

She won a bronze medal at the 2015 European Games, which served as European junior championship, in 400m medley style with a new national record. At the 2015 Junior World Championship held in Singapore, at the age of 15, she came in 5th place in the finals with a new national record in the 400m medley which was also an Olympic qualifying time. Therefore, she represented Serbia at the 2016 Olympic Games.

In October 2018, she won the silver medal in the girls' 200 m individual medley at the 2018 Youth Olympic Games in Buenos Aires, Argentina, behind gold medal winner Anastasia Gorbenko of Israel.

References

External links
 
 
 
 
  (archive)

Serbian female swimmers
2000 births
Living people
Sportspeople from Pančevo
Swimmers at the 2015 European Games
European Games bronze medalists for Serbia
European Games medalists in swimming
Swimmers at the 2016 Summer Olympics
Olympic swimmers of Serbia
Swimmers at the 2018 Mediterranean Games
Mediterranean Games silver medalists for Serbia
Swimmers at the 2018 Summer Youth Olympics
Mediterranean Games medalists in swimming
Swimmers at the 2020 Summer Olympics
21st-century Serbian women